The ITU Mustafa Inan Library was a printing house was established in 1795 at the first engineering school ever to be opened in Halıcıoğlu under the name of Mühendishane-i Berri Hümayun. The books published here constituted the core of the ITU Library. ITU libraries, located in Maslak campus, Istanbul, have approximately 500,000 volumes of books periodicals, and dissertations. The number of subscription periodicals is 1,300. A part of the library is open 7 day/24 hours. There are libraries in other campuses of ITU: Ratip Berker Library in School of Mechanical engineering, Macka library, Taskisla library and Tuzla library. In addition to these general purpose libraries there is a music library in Macka campus for Turkish Music State Conservatory.

References

External links 
 ITU Mustafa Inan Library, official website (En)
 ITU Mustafa Inan Library, official website (Tr)
 Library e-bulletin
 Memory Album
 Resources and Services
 Library photos

Istanbul Technical University
Academic libraries
Libraries in Istanbul
1795 establishments in the Ottoman Empire
Libraries established in 1795